John Dormer  may refer to:

Sir John Dormer (of Dorton) (died 1629) English MP for Clitheroe and Aylesbury
John Dormer (Parliamentarian) (c. 1611–1679) English MP for Buckingham
Sir John Dormer, 1st Baronet (c. 1640–1675), of the Dormer baronets
John Dormer (Jesuit) (1636–1700), English Jesuit
John Dormer, 7th Baron Dormer (1691–1785), Baron Dormer
John Baptist Joseph Dormer, 12th Baron Dormer (1830–1900), Baron Dormer

See also
Dormer (surname)